Perseus-M is a pair of microsatellite developed by Russian-American company Dauria Aerospace and launched in 2014. The satellite is built in 6U Cubesat bus (0.3x0.2x0.1m), optimized for piggy-back launch.
All instruments are powered by solar cells mounted on the one side of spacecraft, providing approximately 6W average power.

Launch
Perseus-M1 and Perseus-M2 were launched from Dombarovsky site 13, Russia, on 19 June 2014 by a Dnepr rocket. Telemetry beacons were received and decoded by multiple amateur ground station operators starting on 6 July 2014.

Mission
The satellites are intended primarily for radio-frequency maritime surveillance under contract with Russian Federation.

See also

 2014 in spaceflight

References

External links 

 Dauria Aerospace facebook page (mixed English and Russian)
 http://www.deimos-space.com/en/ 

Satellites orbiting Earth
Satellites of Russia
Spacecraft launched in 2014
2014 in Russia
Spacecraft launched by Dnepr rockets